Club Portugalete is a Spanish football team based in Portugalete, in the autonomous community of Basque Country. Founded in 1909, it plays in Tercera División RFEF – Group 4, holding home games at Estadio La Florida, with a capacity of 5,000 seats.

History
Football arrived to the city of Portugalete in the end of the 19th century, with the first club of the city (Athletic Club Portugalete) being created in 1899. The history of Club Portugalete goes back to 1909, when Alfredo Hervias founded Club Deportivo Portugalete.

Refounded in 1921 under the name of Portugalete Football Club, the club ceased activities in 1936 due to the Spanish Civil War, returning in 1939 under the name of Club Deportivo Portugalete Chiqui and acting as a B-team of CD Portugalete (which was already a separated club at that time), but only remaining active for one season.

In 1944, the club was refounded as Nuevo Club Portugalete, and switched to the current name in 1956.

Club names
Club Deportivo Portugalete (1909–1916)
Portugalete Football Club (1921–1936)
Club Deportivo Portugalete Chiqui (1939–1940)
Nuevo Club Portugalete (1944–1956)
Club Portugalete (1956–present)

Season to season

3 seasons in Segunda División B
31 seasons in Tercera División
1 season in Tercera División RFEF

Current squad

Out on loan

References

External links
Official website 
Futbolme team profile 
Club & stadium history Estadios de España 

Football clubs in the Basque Country (autonomous community)
Association football clubs established in 1909
1909 establishments in Spain
Sport in Biscay